Bersi Skáldtorfuson was an Icelandic skald, active around the year 1000 CE. He was a court poet to Earl Sveinn Hákonarson. During the Battle of Nesjar he was captured by King Óláfr Haraldsson's forces. Three of the four stanzas of his that have survived were ostensibly composed while in captivity.

One lausavísa is attributed to Bersi in the surviving fragments of Óláfs saga helga by Styrmir Kárason. But the same stanza is attributed to Sigvatr Þórðarson in Heimskringla and to Óttarr svarti in other sagas on St. Óláfr. Styrmir's saga gives some information on Bersi's career in St. Óláfr's service and indicates that he died in 1030.

Bersi was at some point at the court of King Canute the Great where Sigvatr Þórðarson addressed him in verse after they had both received gifts from the king. Apart from being mentioned in the kings' sagas Bersi also has a minor role in Grettis saga, chapters 15, 23 and 24, where he asks Earl Sveinn to spare Grettir Ásmundarson's life.

Bersi's mother, Skáld-Torfa, was apparently also a poet but none of her works have come down to us.

Poetry
Bersi Skáldtorfuson: "Flokkr um Óláf" 1-3:

See also 

 List of Icelandic writers
 List of skalds
 Icelandic literature

References

Notes

Bibliography
 Björnsson, Eysteinn (2001). Lexicon of Kennings: The Domain of Battle.
Fox, Denton and Hermann Pálsson (translators) (2001). Grettir's Saga. University of Toronto Press. 
 Jónsson, Finnur (1931). Lexicon Poeticum. København: S. L. Møllers Bogtrykkeri.
Hollander, Lee M (editor and translator). (1991). Heimskringla: History of the Kings of Norway. University of Texas Press. 
Monsen, Erling (editor and translator) and A. H. Smith (translator) (2004). Heimskringla Or the Lives of the Norse Kings. Kessinger Publishing. 
Poole, Russell G. (1991). Viking Poems on War and Peace. University of Toronto Press. 
Bersi Skáldtorfuson Extant poetry

11th-century Icelandic poets